The Long Road is a 1911 American short silent drama film directed by D. W. Griffith and starring Blanche Sweet.

Cast
 Blanche Sweet as Edith
 Grace Henderson as Edith's Mother
 Charles West as Ned
 Claire McDowell as Ned's Wife
 Edna Foster as Ned's Son
 Kate Bruce as Mother Superior
 Edwin August as At Party
 William J. Butler as At Party
 Donald Crisp as A Servant / The Landlord

See also
 D. W. Griffith filmography
 Blanche Sweet filmography

References

External links

1911 films
1911 short films
American silent short films
Biograph Company films
American black-and-white films
1911 drama films
Films directed by D. W. Griffith
Silent American drama films
1910s American films